The Estadio Armando Maestre Pavajeau is a football stadium in Valledupar, Colombia. It has a capacity of 11,000 and is the home stadium of Valledupar F.C.

References

Valledupar
Armando Maestre Pavajeau
Buildings and structures in Cesar Department